Psalm 136 is the 136th psalm of the Book of Psalms, beginning in English in the King James Version: "O give thanks unto the LORD; for he is good: for his mercy endureth for ever. ". The Book of Psalms is part of the third section of the Hebrew Bible, and a book of the Christian Old Testament. In the slightly different numbering system used in the Greek Septuagint and Latin Vulgate translations of the Bible, this psalm is Psalm 135. In Latin, it is known by the incipit, "". It is sometimes referred to as "The Great Hallel". The Jerusalem Bible calls it a "Litany of Thanksgiving". It is notable for the refrain which forms the second half of each verse, translated as "For His mercy endures forever" in the New King James Version, or "for his steadfast love endures for ever" in the Revised Standard Version.

Psalm 136 is used in both Jewish and Christian liturgies. It has been paraphrased in hymns, and was set to music.

Text

Hebrew Bible version 
The following is the Hebrew text of Psalm 136:

King James Version 
 O give thanks unto the LORD; for he is good: for his mercy endureth for ever.
 O give thanks unto the God of gods: for his mercy endureth for ever.
 O give thanks to the Lord of lords: for his mercy endureth for ever.
 To him who alone doeth great wonders: for his mercy endureth for ever.
 To him that by wisdom made the heavens: for his mercy endureth for ever.
 To him that stretched out the earth above the waters: for his mercy endureth for ever.
 To him that made great lights: for his mercy endureth for ever:
 The sun to rule by day: for his mercy endureth for ever:
 The moon and stars to rule by night: for his mercy endureth for ever.
 To him that smote Egypt in their firstborn: for his mercy endureth for ever:
 And brought out Israel from among them: for his mercy endureth for ever:
 With a strong hand, and with a stretched out arm: for his mercy endureth for ever.
 To him which divided the Red sea into parts: for his mercy endureth for ever:
 And made Israel to pass through the midst of it: for his mercy endureth for ever:
 But overthrew Pharaoh and his host in the Red sea: for his mercy endureth for ever.
 To him which led his people through the wilderness: for his mercy endureth for ever.
 To him which smote great kings: for his mercy endureth for ever:
 And slew famous kings: for his mercy endureth for ever:
 Sihon king of the Amorites: for his mercy endureth for ever:
 And Og the king of Bashan: for his mercy endureth for ever:
 And gave their land for an heritage: for his mercy endureth for ever:
 Even an heritage unto Israel his servant: for his mercy endureth for ever.
 Who remembered us in our low estate: for his mercy endureth for ever:
 And hath redeemed us from our enemies: for his mercy endureth for ever.
 Who giveth food to all flesh: for his mercy endureth for ever.
 O give thanks unto the God of heaven: for his mercy endureth for ever.

Structure 
The psalm is arranged in well marked groups of three verses to the end of verse 18, after which follow two groups of four verses.

Uses

Judaism 
The term Great Hallel, meaning "great praise", is used to refer to Psalm 136. It is called "great" to differentiate it from the Egyptian Hallel, another prayer of praise comprising psalms 113 to 118. In the Talmud, opinions vary whether Great Hallel includes only Psalm 136, or else chapters 135-136, or else chapters 134-136; the accepted opinion is that it only includes 136.

 The Hebrew text of the Book of Ecclesiasticus contains a hymn of thanksgiving inserted after Ecclesiasticus 51:12 which is "an obvious imitation" of this psalm, see  in the New American Bible Revised Edition.
 This psalm is recited in its entirety during the Pesukei Dezimra on Shabbat, Yom Tov, and - in many communities - on Hoshana Rabbah. It is also recited towards the end of the Hallel section of the Passover seder.
 It is recited on the eighth day of Passover in some traditions.
 Verse 1 is part of the final paragraph of Birkat Hamazon.
 Verse 4 is recited when opening the Hakafot on Simchat Torah.
 Verse 6 is recited in Rokah Ha'aertz Al Hamayim of Birkat HaShachar.
 Verse 7 is part of Likel Barukh in Blessings before the Shema.
 Verse 25 is part of the opening paragraph of Birkat Hamazon.

Verse 1,
[They] worshiped and gave thanks to the Lord, saying,
"For he is good, for his steadfast love endures forever"
was recited at Solomon's dedication of the Temple; Charles Spurgeon suggests that the whole psalm was sung.

Eastern Orthodox 
 Along with Psalm 135 (LXX numbers as 134 and 135 respectively) this psalm is called the Polyeleos or translated to "Many Mercies", named such after the refrain used "for His mercy endures forever". The Polyeleos is sung at Orthros (Matins) of a Feast Day and at Vigils. In some Slavic traditions and on Mount Athos it is read every Sunday at Orthros.
 On Mount Athos, it is considered one of the most joyful periods of Matins-Liturgy, and the highest point of Matins. In Athonite practice, all the candles are lit, and the chandeliers are made to swing as the Psalms are sung, it is also accompanied by a joyful peal of the bells and censing of the church, sometimes with a hand censer which has many bells on it.
 At vigils, it accompanies the opening of the Royal Doors and a great censing of the nave by the Priest(s) or Deacon(s).

Coptic Orthodox 
This Psalm is chanted as the second Canticle or the second Hoos of the Midnight Praises known as Tasbeha, a nightly prayer practiced in Coptic Orthodox Churches and Monasteries.

Literature 
John Milton wrote an English paraphrase of Psalm 136 among his poems of 1645.

Musical settings 
John Milton paraphrased the beginning in the hymn "Let us with a gladsome mind" in 1623. The German round, "Danket, danket dem Herrn" from the 18th century is also a paraphrase of verse 1.

Heinrich Schütz composed two setting in German in his Psalmen Davids in 1618, SWV 32 and SWV 45.  

Verses 1-15 were set by Roxanna Panufnik as "Love Endureth" in 2012. "Forever", written by Chris Tomlin in 2001, also draws heavily on this psalm for its lyrics.

References

External links

 
 
  in Hebrew and English - Mechon-mamre
 Text of Psalm 136 according to the 1928 Psalter
 Praise the LORD, for he is good, for his mercy endures forever text and footnotes, usccb.org United States Conference of Catholic Bishops
 Psalm 136:1 introduction and text, biblestudytools.com
 Psalm 136 – God’s Never-Ending Mercy enduringword.com
 Psalm 136 at biblegateway.com
 Psalm 136 / Give thanks to the Lord, for he is gracious. Church of England
 Hymns for Psalm 136 hymnary.org

136
Shacharit for Shabbat and Yom Tov
Hallel